Dry Ridge may refer to:

Dry Ridge, Kentucky, a home rule-class city[1] in Grant County
Dry Ridge, Ohio, a census-designated place (CDP) in Hamilton County
Dry Ridge Mountain, in Wyoming